Circe Offering the Cup to Ulysses is an oil painting in the Pre-Raphaelite style by John William Waterhouse that was created in 1891.

The painting depicts a scene from the Odyssey. Circe, a sorceress, offers a cup to Odysseus (commonly Ulysses in English). In the cup is a potion. Circe seeks to bring Ulysses under her spell, as she has done with his crew. Two of Ulysses' crewmen have been transformed into pigs, one can be seen beside Circe's feet on the right, while the other is peering out from behind her throne on the left. Ulysses' reflection can be seen in the mirror which is behind Circe's throne.

It reflects the columns of Circe's palace, and Ulysses' ship. Odysseus, intrepid and worried about his sailors, tries to save them and on the way Hermes (the messenger of the immortals) intercepts him and tells him of Circe's intentions, advising him to find a special plant that keeps him away from the effects of Circe's drink. After Odysseus had the plant he was able to resist the evil effects of Circe's potion. So when the sorceress thought that she had had the effect of her drink, she went to touch Odysseus with her wand to complete the transformation process and then, Odysseus threatened Circe with his sword, who immediately surrendered, and returned his sailors to the human form.

See also
Circe Invidiosa, another depiction of Circe by Waterhouse

References

1891 paintings
Paintings by John William Waterhouse
Paintings of Greek goddesses
Paintings in Manchester
Witches in art
Paintings based on the Odyssey
Pigs in art
Food and drink paintings
Frogs in art
Circe
Mirrors in art
Ships in art